Lancaster was a small city situated on the west side of the Saint John River at its mouth into the Bay of Fundy. 

It was first founded in 1875, absorbed the towns of Beaconsfield and Fairview in 1953. It was amalgamated into Saint John, New Brunswick in 1967.

Politics 
Lancaster is part of the provincial Saint John Lancaster riding and the federal Saint John—Rothesay riding.

External links
 Brief history
 

Neighbourhoods in Saint John, New Brunswick
Populated places disestablished in 1967